Lesbian, gay, bisexual, and transgender (LGBT) persons in Turkmenistan face active discrimination and stigmatization compared to non-LGBT residents. Turkmenistan is one of the only three post-Soviet countries where male homosexual activity remains criminalised, along with Uzbekistan and Chechnya.

Law 

Male homosexuality is explicitly illegal and sodomy—defined as sexual intercourse between men—is punishable by up to two years in prison, with additional terms of two to five years in a labor camp possible, under the Criminal Code of Turkmenistan, Chapter 3; Article 135, section (1). In addition, the provisions of Article 19 of the code allow for increased penalties for repeat convictions, applying to any crime under the code. Prior to a 2019 amendment, the 1997 code's maximum term was two years. 

The 1927 code of the Turkmen SSR had far less detailed provisions than the 1997 code adopted after independence. The law was enforced rarely before the ascension of Gurbanguly Berdimuhamedow to presidency in 2006.

Investigations into offences under Article 135 are grossly humiliating and may involve torture by state and non-state actors. Homosexuality is institutionally perceived as a form of mental disorder. Repeat prosecutions can incur compulsory admission to psychiatric clinics where internees may be subjected to involuntary conversion therapy.

No penal provisions exist for female homosexuality who, along with transsexual persons, are an unacknowledged category in Turkmen law.

Towards anti-discrimination legislation 
Turkmenistan has consistently rejected pleas to implement anti-discrimination legislation, despite requests by multiple nations via three Universal Periodic Reviews. In dialogue with various wings of the United Nations, Turkmenistan has justified the discriminatory frameworks by arguing any deviations to be a potential threat to the fabric of Turkmen traditions and society.

In February 2021, the Turkmen Government noted to the Office of the United Nations High Commissioner for Human Rights about intentions to "reconsider the reasoning of the article criminalizing consensual same-sex relations" and "study the option of introducing anti-discrimination legislation".

Society and culture 
No civil society exists in Turkmenistan, media is entirely owned by the state, and conducting field-surveys is very difficult. These conditions render scarce the availability of any surveillance data on LGBT rights and allied issues. However, reports of the extra-judicial consequences of being gay include: state-sponsored violence, including torture during criminal investigative process; and vigilante attacks, especially in prison.

In October 2019, a gay doctor was tortured by the state-apparatus for a long span of time, before temporarily disappearing. In May 2020, multiple well-known figures from the modelling industry were arrested on the charges of homosexuality. Turkmen lesbians have been granted asylum in the United States. Gays have been documented to have sought refuge in the European Union.

Summary table

See also

 Human rights in Turkmenistan
 LGBT rights in Asia

Notes

References

Human rights in Turkmenistan
Turkmenistan
LGBT in Turkmenistan
Law of Turkmenistan